Satyricon is the fourth studio album by British electronic music group Meat Beat Manifesto.

Track listing
"Pot Sounds" – 2:06
"Mindstream" – 4:52
"Drop" – 4:07
"Original Control (Version 1)" – 5:02
"Your Mind Belongs to the State" – 5:02
"Circles" – 4:15
"The Sphere" – 0:39
"Brainwashed This Way/Zombie/That Shirt" – 5:31
"Original Control (Version 2)" – 5:22
"Euthanasia" – 4:33
"Edge of No Control, Pt. 1" – 5:59
"Edge of No Control, Pt. 2" – 3:15
"Untold Stories" – 1:52
"Son of Sam" – 4:49
"Track 15" – 1:27
"Placebo" – 5:04

Samples
Several of the dialogue samples used on Satyricon come from the 1974 John Carpenter film Dark Star, specifically:
 "Drop" samples the scene in which Bomb #20 refuses to detach from the bomb bay doors.
 "Track 15" includes a clip from the end of the film when Talby enters the Phoenix asteroid cluster, saying, "I'm beginning to glow."
 "Original Control (Version 1)" has a sample from the dinner discussion between Pinback and Doolittle: "Do you think we'll ever find any intelligent life out there?" ... "Who cares?"

Other samples found on the album include:

 "We have come to visit you in peace and with goodwill", from the film The Day the Earth Stood Still, in"Pot Sounds".
"He must answers questions that cannot yet be...", from the film The Illustrated Man, in "Placebo".
Interview samples from the Monkees' film Head and the James Toback documentary The Big Bang, in "Your Mind Belongs to the State".
"I am Elektro", a sample from Elektro the robot, first seen at the 1939 New York World's Fair, in "Original Control (Version 2)".
"Brainwashed This Way/Zombie/That Shirt" contains dialog from David Cronenberg's 1983 movie Videodrome.

References

Meat Beat Manifesto albums
1992 albums
Elektra Records albums